"Magkaisa" (Tagalog for "unite") is a 1986 Filipino pop song performed by Virna Lisa (Virna Lisa Loberiza) and composed by Tito Sotto, which is notable for being one of three iconic songs associated with the People Power Revolution of 1986 - the other two being "Handog ng Pilipino sa Mundo" and the traditional kundiman anthem "Bayan Ko".

Writing and arrangement
Sotto wrote the song over the course of three days, with the assistance of arranger Homer Flores and record producer Ernie dela Peña.  The back-up singers singing alongside Virna Lisa were Babsie Molina, Bambi Bonus and Vic Sotto.

Recording
Virna Lisa recorded the song at the Tasha Recording Studio in Libis on the evening of March 1, 1986.

Reception
The song was greatly popular with the masses in the days after the ouster of President Ferdinand Marcos and his eventual departure to Hawaii on 25 February 1986.

It was then a big hit when the song played on radio stations and the music video associated with it aired on major television stations in the country, a month after the Revolution.

Significant covers
Sarah Geronimo sang the song on August 5, 2009, during the funeral of Cory Aquino. This version of the song is included in the album "Paalam, Maraming Salamat Pres. Aquino: A Memorial Tribute Soundtrack" by Star Music.

Regine Velasquez sang her version of the song during the Tatak EDSA 25 concert that commemorates the 25th anniversary of the People Power Revolution.

See also
"Handog ng Pilipino sa Mundo", another song related to the 1986 Revolution.

References

1986 in the Philippines
1986 songs
Filipino patriotic songs
People Power Revolution
Tagalog-language songs